Skanstull, formerly known as Ringvägen, is a station on the Green line of the Stockholm metro.

Skanstull is, along with Medborgarplatsen, the oldest underground station on the metro, actually predating that system by some years. On 1 October 1950, it became part of Stockholm's first metro line when the Södertunneln was adapted to become part of the line from Slussen south to Hökarängen, and the station was remodelled to full metro standard. Originally known as Ringvägen, the station took its current name when it reopened as part of the metro. The entrance at Allhelgonagatan was opened on 21 November 1957, the station was rebuilt in 2003–2004, and the platform was upgraded in 2009.

Gallery

References

External links

Images of Skanstull by Thomas Flachsbinder

Green line (Stockholm metro) stations
Railway stations opened in 1933
Railway stations opened in 1950
1933 establishments in Sweden
1950 establishments in Sweden